Myer's College is a university-preparatory school located at Chakwal, Punjab, in Pakistan. The college is affiliated with Cambridge International Examinations(PK 035:Myer's College) and offers Cambridge O-Level and A-level qualifications.
The O-level subjects on offer as of 2018, are English Language, Mathematics, Biology, Chemistry, Physics, Islamiat, Pakistan Studies, Urdu (First Language) and Computer Science.

Classes are held at Kot Sarfraz Khan campus close to the Central Chakwal city.

History
Myer's College was established on April 19, 1999, when classes were started in the colonial style historic bungalow built by the late Raja Muhammed Sarfraz Khan, a philanthropist and politician. It was founded by his grandson, Raja Yassir Humayun Sarfraz, and was named after a Rajput prince, Raja Mair, the first settler in this area and ancestor of the Mair-Minhas tribe, an offshoot of the  Jamwal Dogra Rajputs. 

The opening ceremony of the college was held on 18 November 2000 and Amir of Bahawalpur, His Royal Highness Nawab Salahudin Abbasi was the chief guest.

Organization
Myer's College is divided into five schools:
 Pre-School (Montessori-Prep)
 Junior School (Grade 1–4)
 Preparatory School (Grade 5–7)
 Senior School (Grade 8–11)
 College (Grade 12–13)

Each school's students are divided among houses. The houses promote inter-house competitions and mentorship opportunities.
The five houses are:
 Khan Sarfraz
 General Akbar
 Ch. Chaku
 Raja Aurangzeb
 Rashid Minhas

The Senior school offers School Certificate/O-level in affiliation with Cambridge International Examinations and the college offers Higher School Certificate/A-level (for grades 12–13). Myer's College is affiliated with Aga Khan Examination board and its college section offers Intermediate Level pre-medical classes.

External links
Official website

Schools in Punjab, Pakistan
Cambridge schools in Pakistan
Educational institutions established in 1999
1999 establishments in Pakistan